Dan Weller (born 3 April 1980) is a producer/mixer/writer and guitarist, known for his work in rock and metal. He was born in Liverpool and moved to Hertfordshire at age 6. At 15 he began playing guitar and formed a band with school friends. That band later became SikTh.

SikTh 
In 1999/2000 Weller and school friend Graham Pinney formed SikTh. They recruited singers Mikee W Goodman and Justin Hill, bassist James Leach and drummer Dan 'Loord' Foord. SikTh went on to become one of the UK's most influential Heavy Metal bands releasing 3 EP's and 2 Albums internationally. In 2011 The Guardian wrote that along with Swedish band Meshuggah, SikTh were the founders of the international Metal phenomenon Djent. SikTh became very popular across the world and particularly in the UK, US and Japan. SikTh split up in 2008 but reformed in 2014, when they toured Germany, Japan, Nepal, and Britain and appeared at the BIG69 festival in Mumbai, India in 2015. The band also appeared in the Indian version of Rolling Stone magazine.

Producing 

Having worked with producer Colin Richardson on the first SikTh album, Weller became fascinated by music production. Three years later in Miami he handled production duties on the band's follow-up album Death of a Dead Day. Thus ensued a production career.

Dan is well known as a long term collaborator with UK sonic pioneers Enter Shikari. He produced A Flash Flood of Colour, the third Enter Shikari album at Karma Sound Studios in Thailand, as well as featuring in the band's Phenakistoscope documentary. Dan had previously worked on the band's second album, Common Dreads and also produced follow-up singles "Destabilise" and "Quelle Surprise". Dan then went on to produce the three singles-EP Rat Race and the fourth album of the band, The Mindsweep, which was critically acclaimed.

He produced the debut Young Guns album and the followup, Bones the lead single from which (Bones) achieved active number 1 in America along with being the official theme for WWE wrestlemania.

Writing 
As of January 2016 Weller has been published by Bucks Music Group. He has co-written with countless artists and has a reputation for nurturing/developing talent.

The Vienna-based synth-pop band Hunger was developed by Weller in a co-writing / production capacity. The band's first single, "Amused", was featured on the Netflix show 13 Reasons Why as well as being used on a Mitsubishi television commercial. Notably, Taylor Swift picked the song out for her "Taylor Likes" Spotify playlist.

References

External links 
 

British songwriters
Living people
1980 births
People from Liverpool